Mark Di Ionno (born December 22, 1956) is an American journalist and writer.

Di Ionno is a former general news columnist at New Jersey's top newspaper, The Star-Ledger. He is an adjunct professor of journalism at Rutgers University–Newark. He is a 2013 Pulitzer Prize finalist in news commentary for his columns on Hurricane Sandy, the suicide of Tyler Clementi, and other local events and issues. He later worked with TAPinto.

Di Ionno has written extensively about New Jersey in several books that serve as guides to the landscape and history of the state. Two of his books published with Rutgers University Press, New Jersey's Coastal Heritage: A Guide and A Guide to New Jersey's Revolutionary War Trail won the New Jersey Studies Academic Alliance Award.

Personal
Di Ionno was raised in Summit, New Jersey and graduated Summit High School and Rutgers University–Newark. He served in the U.S. Navy. He is father of six and resides in Mountain Lakes, New Jersey.

Books
New Jersey's Coastal Heritage: A Guide  (Rutgers University Press) 1997
A Guide to New Jersey's Revolutionary War Trail: for Families and History Buffs  (Rutgers University Press) 2000
Backroads, New Jersey: Driving at the Speed of Life (Rutgers University Press) 2002
The Last Newspaperman (Plexus Publishing) 2012 
Gods of Wood and Stone  (Atria Books) 2018

References

External links
 Muckrack

1956 births
Living people
American columnists
American male journalists
Pulitzer Prize for Commentary winners
Journalists from New Jersey
People from Mountain Lakes, New Jersey
People from Summit, New Jersey
Summit High School (New Jersey) alumni